The 2005 Campeonato Gaúcho kicked off on January 30, 2005 and ended June 12, 2005. The 85th season of the league saw eighteen teams participating, with holders Internacional beating 15 de Novembro in the finals for their 37th title. Guarani de Venâncio Aires and São Gabriel were relegated.

Participating teams

System 
The championship would have four stages:

 First stage: The 18 teams were divided into three groups of six teams each. They played against each other inside their groups in a double round-robin system. After 10 rounds, the top two teams of each group, plus the two best third-placed teams qualified to the Semifinals.
 Copa Emílio Perondi: The fourteen teams that didn't participate in the Série A or Série B were divided into 2 groups of seven teams each. They played against each other inside their groups in a double round-robin system. After 14 rounds, the two best teams in each group qualified to the Semifinals, the winners of which would qualify into the Finals, with the winner qualifying to the Série C of that year, and the bottom team in each group being relegated.
 Semifinals: The eight remaining teams were divided in 2 groups of 4 teams each and they played in a double round-robin system. The winner of each group qualified to the Finals.
 Finals: Semifinals group winners played in two matches to define the Champions. The team with best overall record played the second leg at home.

Championship

First stage

Group A

Group B

Group C

Copa Emílio Perondi

Group 1

Group 2

Semifinals

Finals

Semifinals

Group D

Group E

Finals

References 

Campeonato Gaúcho seasons
Gaúcho